Linda S. Hurry is a United States Air Force major general who serves as the Director of Logistics. She previously served as Commander of the Defense Logistics Agency Aviation.

References

Living people
Place of birth missing (living people)
Recipients of the Defense Superior Service Medal
Recipients of the Legion of Merit
United States Air Force generals
Year of birth missing (living people)